Sugarcult is an American rock band from Santa Barbara, California formed in 1999. The band currently consists of Tim Pagnotta (lead vocals, rhythm guitar), Airin Older (bass guitar, backing vocals), Marko DeSantis (lead guitar), and Kenny Livingston (drums, percussion).

History

Formation (1998-99)
Tim Pagnotta met ex-drummer Ben Davis during a cigarette break at school. Davis (who then played bass) and Pagnotta started to play together on a regular basis. Pagnotta met Airin Older in a music class where Pagnotta was copying Older's work. They became good friends and Pagnotta invited Older to join his band. Davis moved to the position of drummer and Older filled in for Davis on bass. Marko DeSantis was added into the band after meeting Pagnotta backstage at a Superdrag concert.

Early releases (1999–2003)
Sugarcult released their first collection of demo recordings, Eleven, in 1999. Their second collection, Wrap Me Up in Plastic, was released in 2000. In 2001, the band released their debut album, Start Static, which featured the hit singles "Pretty Girl", "Bouncing Off The Walls" (also featured in the movie and soundtrack to National Lampoon's Van Wilder) and "Stuck in America". In early 2003, "Stuck in America" won the Los Angeles Regional Poll in The 2nd Annual Independent Music Awards. Start Static featured several songs that had previously been released as demos on Wrap Me Up in Plastic. In May 2001, the band re-released Wrap Me Up in Plastic with a new track listing that included songs from both Eleven and the original Wrap Me Up in Plastic, as well as new artwork. In 2003, Davis officially left Sugarcult. Davis had been regularly missing shows since the release of Start Static, and left Sugarcult to enter rehab to get help for his alcoholism. Pagnotta was close to Davis, and wrote the song "Champagne" about his addictions when he was forced to leave the band.

Later releases (2004–2008)
On April 13, 2004, Sugarcult released Palm Trees and Power Lines and performed on Late Night with Conan O'Brien. This album featured the MTV hits "Memory" and "She's the Blade". Sugarcult successfully landed a spot on the Warped Tour 2004 main stage and they also supported Green Day on their American Idiot tour and Blink-182 on their December 2004 European tour. They released Back to the Disaster, a feature-length documentary film (with a bonus live EP), in late 2005. Lights Out, their latest studio album, was released on September 12, 2006. The release of Lights Out was immediately followed by two tours, a fall tour and a winter tour. Their fall tour included So They Say, Maxeen, Halifax, and The Spill Canvas. Their winter tour included such bands as Meg and Dia, Damone, The Pink Spiders, All Time Low, and The Adored. In 2006, Sugarcult song "Do It Alone" was featured on the CW's show One Tree Hill during Season and in the film Employee of the Month. Sugarcult played at the Soundwave Tour in 2008.

Hiatus and occasional shows (2009–present)
The band members took a year off in 2009 from Sugarcult for their 10-year anniversary to do their own side-projects. They were neither broken up, nor were known to be working on new Sugarcult material as of mid-2010.

At the end of 2010, they announced that they would play at least two shows in the United Kingdom and then perform at the Belgium music festival Groezrock, all at the end of April.

Sugarcult (with Davis) played a one-off show at the Chain Reaction in Anaheim, California on December 10, 2011, where they celebrated the tenth anniversary of the release of Start Static. More recently, members of the group performed with members of 5 Seconds of Summer (who have cited Sugarcult as a primary influence on their band) and past tourmate Goldfinger frontman and acclaimed record producer John Feldmann for Strange '80s, a benefit concert on May 14, 2017 at the Fonda Theatre.

Band members

Current members
Tim Pagnotta – lead vocals, rhythm guitar (1998–present)
Airin Older – bass guitar, backing vocals (1998–present)
Marko DeSantis – lead guitar (1999–present)
Kenny Livingston – drums (2003–present)

Former members
Ben Davis – drums, backing vocals (1998–2003, 2011)

Discography

Demo collections
 Eleven (1999)
 Wrap Me Up in Plastic (2000)

Studio albums
 Start Static (2001) No. 194 US
 Palm Trees and Power Lines (2004) No. 46 US
 Lights Out (2006) No. 64

DVDs/retrospectives/live albums
 Action DVD (2002)
 Back to the Disaster: A Film About Sugarcult DVD/EP (2005)
 Rewind 2001–2008 Japanese Exclusive (2008)

EPs
 Five Demo (1998)
 Get Street Cred Demo (1999)
 Hard Days Night Japanese Exclusive (2006)

Singles

Media appearances
 Burnout 3: Takedown (2004)
 "Memory" was featured on the soundtrack.
 Burnout Paradise (2008) and Burnout Paradise Remastered (2018)
Dead Living was featured on the soundtrack.

References

Musical groups established in 1999
Pop punk groups from California
Fearless Records artists
Independent Music Awards winners
V2 Records artists
1999 establishments in California